The Wright Whirlwind was a family of air-cooled radial aircraft engines built by Wright Aeronautical (originally an independent company, later a division of Curtiss-Wright). The family began with nine-cylinder engines, and later expanded to include five-cylinder and seven-cylinder varieties. Fourteen-cylinder twin-row versions were also developed, but these were not commercially produced.

The Whirlwind series was succeeded by more powerful but still air-cooled radial aero engines, notably the Pratt & Whitney Wasp series and the Wright Cyclone series.

Description
The Whirlwind was a direct descendant of the Lawrance J-1, a nine-cylinder air-cooled radial built by the Lawrance Aero Engine Company for the U.S. Navy. Because the Navy was very enthusiastic about air-cooled radials, but was concerned that Lawrance could not produce enough engines for its needs, it forced Wright to purchase the Lawrance company in 1923 and build the J-1 itself. Wright's J-1 was the first engine in its nine-cylinder R-790 Whirlwind series and was quickly followed by the J-3, J-4, J-4A, J-4B, and finally the popular and successful J-5 of 1925.

In 1928, Wright replaced the R-790 series with the J-6 Whirlwind family, in which a supercharger was added to boost engine power and the cylinders were enlarged by expanding the bore. This family included three members: the nine-cylinder R-975, the seven-cylinder R-760, and the five-cylinder R-540, providing a range of different power levels using the same basic design. Of these, the R-975 proved the most popular, especially because of its use in armored fighting vehicles during World War II.

These were used in a number of military aircraft prototypes, but neither engine reached the production stage.

Air-cooled Whirlwinds were lighter and more reliable than liquid-cooled engines of similar power, since a liquid cooling system added weight and required extra maintenance. Thanks to these advantages Whirlwind engines were used widely and were built in large numbers. Licensed copies were produced by manufacturers such as Continental Motors, Hispano-Suiza, and adapted for Soviet government production by the Shvetsov OKB-19 design bureau. The Whirlwind's success led to the development of other air-cooled radial engines throughout the 1920s, 1930s, and 1940s.

Whirlwind series
 J-5 / R-790: 9-cylinder radial, . Produced 1923-1928.
 J-6-5 / R-540: 5-cylinder radial, . Produced 1928-1937.
 J-6-7 / R-760: 7-cylinder radial, . Produced 1928-1945.
 J-6-9 / R-975: 9-cylinder radial, . Produced 1928-1950s.
 R-1510: 14-cylinder twin-row radial, . Introduced 1933, prototypes only.
 R-1670: 14-cylinder twin-row radial, . Introduced 1934, prototypes only.

See also

 Whirlwind Glaciers in Antarctica named after the Wright Whirlwind series

References

 
 . Available from the Aircraft Engine Historical Society's reference page.
 . Available from the Aircraft Engine Historical Society's reference page.

Aircraft air-cooled radial piston engines
1920s aircraft piston engines